The Dragon Years  (subtitled The 40th Anniversary Collection) is a compilation album by the New Zealand band Dragon. The album was released in September 2012 and peaked at number 21 in the New Zealand chart.

This comprehensive 40 track, 2-CD set contains a disc of all the hits, and a special second disc of new songs recorded since the band reformed in 2006.

Upon release, band member Todd Hunter said; “When a band has been around for 40 years it’s just not possible to thank everyone who should be acknowledged within the confines of a cramped CD cover. From the 40 musicians who have been through the band in the last 4 decades to all those who have been through the Dragon crews in different eras we salute you. To all the record companies we have plagued and all managers who had to manage the unmanageable in the early days, cheers. We must acknowledge the songwriters for their memorable songs that are a joy to play and have such longevity that the 20 year olds are googling the lyrics on their phones and singing along at the shows now.“ 

To promote the release, Dragon toured New Zealand in October and November 2012.

Track listing

Charts

Release history

References

Dragon (band) albums
2012 greatest hits albums
Liberation Records albums
Compilation albums by Australian artists